Chandu Shah (fl. late 16th and early 17th century, alternatively known as Chandu Lal and Chandu Mal) was an affluent banker and revenue official of the Mughal emperors from Lahore who conspired against the fifth Sikh guru, Guru Arjan.

Biography 
He was from a Sahi (Shahi) Khatri background and was in the service of the Subahdar (governor) of Lahore province. His hostility towards the Guru began when he was severely miffed by the rejection of his marital proposal that the Guru's son, Hargobind, be wed to his daughter. He initially appealed to Akbar to punish the Guru based on a false complaint but this fell on deaf ears as Akbar had a high-opinion of Arjan. After Akbar's passing, he continued to plead for the Guru's punishment with the newly enthroned emperor, Jahangir. He teamed up with Prithi Chand, the excommunicated son of Guru Ram Das who was seething at being passed over for the guruship, in his mission against the Guru. Eventually, his instigations finally proved successful and the Guru was arrested and brought to Lahore, where he was tortured to death. According to one local Lahori version of the events, Chandu Shah paid the emperor to obtain custody of the Guru to personally torture him at his house.

Death 
Chandu Shah was eventually handed over to the Sikhs by Jahangir after the latter having been told about his scheming and misleading conspiracies by Guru Hargobind and was executed. He died after been led by procession through the streets of Lahore, suffering from shoe beatings from angry observers, and suffered a fatal strike from an iron ladle. Ironically, the torturer who had tortured Guru Arjan was also the one who tortured Chandu Shah. It has been argued by Pashaura Singh that Jahangir shifted blame for the execution of the Guru solely on Chandu Shah as a means to escape responsibility himself. Chandu Shah's haveli in Lahore, known as 'Chandu de Haveli', located inside Mochi Gate, was demolished by vexed Sikhs in 1799, the year Maharaja Ranjit Singh conquered the city, but it was rebuilt in 1825.

References

History of Sikhism